This is a list of boat builders, for which there is a Wikipedia article.

Motorboats (<50 feet)
American Skier
Andrée & Rosenqvist
Bayliner 
Beneteau
Boston Whaler 
Brunswick Boat Group
Carter Marine
Carver Yachts
Centurion Boats
Chaparral Boats 
Chris-Craft Boats 
Cimmarron Boats
Clyde Boats
Cobalt Boats
Correct Craft
Cruisers Yachts
Evinrude
Front Street Shipyard
Glastron
Gulf Craft
HanseYachts
Jade Yachts
Jeanneau
Kadey-Krogen Yachts
Lowe Boats
Malibu Boats 
MasterCraft 
Maxum 
Nautique
Ocean Alexander
Pearson Yachts
Porta-bote
Sea Ray
Ski Nautique
StanCraft Boat Company
Sunseeker 
Ta shing (yacht)
Tayana Yachts
Tiara Yachts
Tollycraft 
Trojan Yachts
Uniflite
Wacanda Marine 
Herbert Woods 
Horizon Yachts
Yamaha Motor Corporation
Princess Yachts
Benetti 
Blohm + Voss 
Burger Boat Company
Cantieri di Pisa
Codecasa 
Ferretti Group 
Front Street Shipyard
Gulf Craft 
ICON Yachts 
Lazzara
Lürssen 
Mondomarine 
Nobiskrug 
oceAnco
Royal Yacht
Sunseeker
Su Marine Yachts 
Wally Yachts 
A.F. Theriault & Sons Shipyard

Sailboats
Amel Yachts
Bavaria Yachtbau
Beneteau
Dufour Yachts
Jeanneau
J/Boats
Pearson Yachts
Pogo Structures
Sunseeker
Nautor's Swan

Catamarans
Farrier Marine
Front Street Shipyard

Trimarans
Corsair Marine
Farrier Marine

Luxury yachts
KaiserWerft
Feadship 
Perini Navi

Watersports, dinghies, launches & tenders
Bombardier 
Boston Whaler
Bossoms Boatyard 
Corsair Marine 
Honda Marine Group
Kawasaki Heavy Industries 
Yamaha Motor Corporation 
Zodiac Group 
Z1 Boats

See also
Boat
List of boat types
List of sailboat designers and manufacturers
Rigid Inflatable Boat
Sailing
Sailing (sport)
Ski boat
Yacht racing

References

 
Boat